Local elections were held in the Soviet Union in 1925. They were held as a result of low turnout in the 1924 elections causing the results in 40% of rural districts to be invalid, as a 50% turnout was required.

According to Soviet law, multiple individuals, out of the eligible adult voting population were disenfranchised for various reasons.

References

The Distinctiveness of Soviet Law. Ferdinand Joseph Maria Feldbrugge, ed. Martinus Nijhoff Publishers: Dordrecht (1987): 110.

1925 elections in the Soviet Union